Vavel (stylized VAVEL) is a sports news website. It has 16 editions; Spain, United States, United Kingdom, Singapore, Italy, France, Argentina, Uruguay, Brazil, Portugal, Germany, Mexico, Colombia, Peru, Ecuador, Venezuela and an edition representing Middle Eastern countries. VAVEL is able to readers in 7 different languages.

In August 2016, VAVEL launched a daily digital broadcast available through Facebook and YouTube live channels.

History

Creation 
The site was created by Javier Robles, a sports journalist, while studying at the University of Rey Juan Carlos in Madrid (2008–2009).

The website was launched in April 2009 as a social media platform revolving around sports where users could configure their profiles with team logos and preferences. There was also multimedia tools in which users could personalize their own blog, upload images and videos, and interact with other users through direct messaging within their profile.

At the same time that this social media platform was launched in vavel.com, in the domain vavel.es, a sports newspaper was released. The first article was published on June 28, 2009 and the writing staff consisted of college students entirely. Later the newspaper changed to vavel.com domain.

VAVEL was selected by the Foreign Trade Institute of the Spanish Government  in its Spain Tech Center immersion program in Silicon Valley at the end of 2017 as startup with the possibility to settle in the American market.

In March 2019, the Singapore edition of VAVEL was launched by Jovier Robles after naming A Z Mohamed Sohail Shamsudeen as VAVEL Singapore's Editor-In-Chief. The first article was published on March 11, 2019.

References

External links 
 
 Official Twitter account
 Interview with Javier Robles, creator of VAVEL
Official Twitter account of VAVEL Singapore

MediaNews Group
Sports newspapers